The little village of Santa Marina del Sil is situated by the river Sil, 7 km from the town of Congosto in Spain, and 15 km from the town of Ponferrada, in the province of León, in Spain.  Its name refers to Saint Marina.

The village has 85 inhabitants and is located near the Sil river, a tributary of the river Miño.

It is well known for the summer party of La Carpa, during July. This is a famous fishing contest held on the river very near the village. An inhabitant of the village, Angel González, was the founder of the CIT (Centro de Iniciativas Turísticas, Touristic Initiative Center), that organizes the contest.

The inhabitants of the town are traditionally employed in coal mining and chestnut harvesting. By now most of them are working in the town of Ponferrada, Toreno or are retired.

Towns in Spain
Municipalities in the Province of León